This is a list of conflicts in the United States. Conflicts are arranged chronologically from the late modern period to contemporary history. This list includes (but is not limited to) the following: Indian wars, skirmishes, wars of independence, liberation wars, colonial wars, undeclared wars, proxy wars, territorial disputes, and world wars. Also listed might be any battle that was itself only part of an operation of a campaign of a theater of a war. There may also be periods of violent civil unrest listed, such as: riots, shootouts, spree killings, massacres, terrorist attacks, and civil wars. The list might also contain episodes of: human sacrifice, mass suicide, genocides, and other related items that have occurred within the geographical area (including overseas territories) of what is today known as, the "United States of America".

Late modern period

18th century

 1775–1783 American Revolutionary War
 1775
Battles of Lexington and Concord
 Siege of Boston
 Battle of Ticonderoga
Battle off Fairhaven
Battle of Machias
 Battle of Bunker Hill
 Battle of Great Bridge
 Battle of Great Cane Break
 1776
Battle of Moore's Creek Bridge
Battle of Long Island
Battle of Harlem Heights
Battle of Mamaroneck
Battle of White Plains
Battle of Fort Washington
Battle of Trenton
 1777
Battle of Princeton
Battle of Ridgefield
 Battle of Gwynn's Island
Battle of Oriskany
Battle of Machias
Battle of Bennington
Battle of Setauket
Battle of Brandywine Creek
Battle of Saratoga
Capture of Philadelphia
Battle of Germantown
 1778
Battle of Monmouth
 Battle of Alligator Creek Bridge
 Capture of Savannah
 1779
Battle of Baton Rouge
 Battle of Van Creek
 Battle of Kettle Creek
 Battle of Brier Creek
Battle of Vincennes
 Battle of Stono Ferry
 Battle of Paulus Hook
 1780
Battle of Young's House
Siege of Charleston
Battle of Monck's Corner
Battle of Lenud's Ferry
 Battle of Connecticut Farms
Battle of Mobley's Meeting House
Battle of Camden
Battle of Musgrove Mill
Battle of Wahab's Plantation
Battle of King's Mountain
Battle of Tearcoat Swamp
Battle of Fishdam Ford
Battle of Blackstock's Farm
 1781
Battle of Cowpens
 Battle of Cowan's Ford
Battle of Guilford Court House
Siege of Ninety Six
Battle of Groton Heights
Siege of Yorktown
 1777–1794 Cherokee–American wars
 1783–1788 Second Pennamite War between settlers from Connecticut and Pennsylvania in Wyoming Valley of Pennsylvania
 1785–1795 Northwest Indian War
 1786–1787 Shays' Rebellion
 1791–1794 Whiskey Rebellion
 1798–1800 Quasi-War, an undeclared naval war with France

19th century

 1804 Battle of Sitka Russian forces defeat the Tlingit in the last major armed conflict between Europeans and Alaska Natives.
 1811 Tecumseh's War
 Battle of Tippecanoe
 1812–1815 War of 1812
 1812
Siege of Fort of Mackinac
Battle of River Canard
First Battle of Sackett's Harbor
Battle of Brownstown
Battle of Maguaga
Battle of Fort Dearborn
Siege of Detroit
Siege of Fort Harrison
Siege of Fort Wayne
Battle of Wild Cat Creek
Battle of the Mississinewa
 1813
Battle of Frenchtown
 Raid on Elizabethtown
 Battle of Ogdensburg
 Siege of Fort Meigs
 Battle of Sackett's Harbor
 Battle of Craney Island
 Battle of Fort Stephenson
 Battle of St. Michaels
Battle of Bladensburg
 Battle of Lake Erie
 Capture of Fort Niagara
 1813
Battle of Tipton's Island
 Battle of Africa Point
Raid on Havre de Grace
Battle of Craney Island
Battle of Fort Stephenson
 1814
 Battle of Longwoods
 Raid on Fort Oswego
Siege of Prairie du Chien
Battle of Big Sandy Creek
 Battle of Rock Island Rapids
Battle of Mackinac Island
Battle of Bladensburg
Burning of Washington
Raid on Alexandria
Battle of Caulk's Field
Battle of North Point
Battle of Lake Champlain
Battle of Baltimore
Battle of Pensacola (1812)
 1815
Battle of New Orleans
 Battle of Fort Peter
 Battle of the Sink Hole
Battle of Fort Bowyer
 1813–1814 Creek War
 1817–1818 First Seminole War
 1823 Arikara War
 1827 Winnebago War
 1831 Nat Turner's Rebellion
 1832 Black Hawk War
 1833 Cutthroat Gap massacre
 1835–1842 Second Seminole War
 1835–1836 Toledo War (bloodless)
 1835–1836 Texas Revolution
October 2, 1835 Battle of Gonzales
October 10, 1835 Battle of Goliad
November 4, 1835 Battle of Lipantitlán
October 28, 1835 Battle of Concepción
November 26, 1835 Grass Fight
October 12 – December 11, 1835 Siege of Béxar
February 27, 1836 Battle of San Patricio
March 2, 1836 Battle of Agua Dulce
February 23 – March 6, 1836 Battle of the Alamo
March 12–15, 1836 Battle of Refugio
March 19–20, 1836 Battle of Coleto
April 21, 1836 Battle of San Jacinto
 1838 Missouri Mormon War
 1838–1839 Aroostook War
 1839 Honey War (bloodless)
 1841–1842 Dorr War
 1845 Milwaukee Bridge War
 1846–1848 Mexican–American War
 1846 
 Battle of Palo Alto
 Battle of Resaca de la Palma
 Battle of Olómpali
 Occupation of Santa Fe
 Battle of Monterey
 Siege of Los Angeles
 Battle of Chino
 Battle of Natividad
 Battle of San Pasqual
 Battle of El Brazito
 1847
 Battle of Rio San Gabriel
 Battle of La Mesa
 Taos Revolt
 1848–1855 Cayuse War
 1849–1855 Jicarilla War
 1850–1853 Yuma War
 1855-1856 Rogue River Wars
 1855 Battle of Hungry Hill
 1854–1858 Bleeding Kansas
 1856 Battle of Black Jack
 1856 Battle of Fort Titus
 1856 Battle of Osawatomie
 1855–1858 Third Seminole War
 1856 Tule River War
 1857–1858 Utah War
 1858–1864 Bald Hills War
 1859 Pig War
 1860 Pyramid Lake War
 1861–1865 American Civil War
 1861
Battle of Fort Sumter
 Battle of Philippi
 Battle of Big Bethel
 Battle of Cole Camp
 First Battle of Mesilla
Battle of Rich Mountain
First Battle of Bull Run
Battle of Wilson's Creek
Battle of Dry Wood Creek
Battle of Barbourville
Battle of Balls Bluff
Battle of Rowlett's Station
 Battle of Mount Zion Church
 1862
Battle of Roan's Tan Yard
Battle of Mill Springs
Battle of Roanoke Island
Battle of Fort Donelson
Battle of Pea Ridge
Battle of Hampton Roads
Battle of Shiloh
Battle of Island Number 10
Battle of Valverde
Battle of Glorieta Pass
Battle of Albuquerque
Battle of Peralta
Battle of Fair Oaks
Battle of Memphis
Battle of Cross Keys
Battle of Port Republic
Seven Days' Battles
Battle of Savage's Station
Battle of Baton Rouge
Battle of Cedar Mountain
Second Battle of Bull Run
Battle of Antietam
Battle of Coffeeville
Battle of Fredericksburg
Battle of Kinston
Battle of Chickasaw Bayou
Battle of Stones River
 1863
Battle of Hartville
 Battle of Deserted House
 Skirmish at Threkeld's Ferry
 Battle of Kelly's Ford
 Battle of Vaught's Hill
 Battle of Brentwood
 Battle of Somerset
 Battle of Newton's Station
 Battle of Chancellorsville
Battle of Port Gibson
Siege of Vicksburg
Battle of Portland Harbor
Battle of Gettysburg
Battle of Helena
Battle of Honey Springs
Battle of Buffington Island
Battle of Chickamauga
Battle of Chattanooga
Battle of Knoxville
 1864
Battle of Loudoun Heights
 Battle of Dandridge
 Battle of Morton's Ford
 Battle of Olustee
 Battle of Okolona
 Battle of Rio Hill
 Battle of Walkerton
 Battle of Laredo
 Battle of Paducah
Battle of the Wilderness
 Battle of Port Walthall Junction
 Siege of Atlanta
Battle of Spotsylvania
Battle of Resaca
Battle of North Anna
Battle of Wilson's Wharf
Battle of Cold Harbor
Battle of Marietta
Battle of Trevilian Station
Siege of Petersburg
Battle of Kennesaw Mountain
Battle of Peachtree Creek
Battle of Atlanta
Battle of the Crater
Battle of Mobile Bay
 Battle of Utoy Creek
 Battle of Jonesborough
 Battle of Vernon
 Battle of Griswoldville
 Battle of Buck Head Creek
Battle of Franklin II
Battle of Honey Hill
Battle of Nashville
Battle of Anthony's Hill
 1865
Battle of Dove Creek
 Battle of Natural Bridge
Battle of Bentonville
 Battle of Lewis's Farm
 Battle of Dinwiddie Court House
Battle of Five Forks
Third Battle of Petersburg
 Battle of Namozine Church
 Battle of Amelia Springs
 Battle of Rice's Station
 Battle of Cumberland Church
Battle of Appomattox Court House
 1862 Dakota War of 1862
 1863–1865 Colorado War
 1864 Sand Creek Massacre
 1865–1866 Fenian Raids
 1866–1868 Red Cloud's War
 1867–1875 Comanche War
 1872–1873 Modoc War
 1873–1888 Colfax County War
 1874 Battle of Liberty Palace
1876–1877 Black Hills War
1876
Battle of Powder River
Battle of the Rosebud
 Battle of the Little Bighorn
 1877
Battle of Wolf Mountain
Battle of Little Muddy Creek
1877 Nez Percé War
 1877 Great Railroad Strike of 1877
1878 Lincoln County War
 1878–1900 Colorado Range War
1881 Gunfight at the O.K. Corral
1882 Pleasant Valley War
1884 Cincinnati Courthouse riots
1885 Rock Springs Massacre
1887 Thibodaux massacre
1887-1894 Hatfield-McCoy Feud
 1889–1893 Johnson County War
 1890–1891 Ghost Dance War
1890
Wounded Knee Massacre
 1891–1892 Coal Creek War
 1891–1893 Garza Revolution
 1892 Homestead Strike
 1894 Pullman Strike
1897 Lattimer massacre
 1898 Spanish–American War
 1898 Battle of Yauco
 1898 Battle of Guayama
 1898 Battle of Coamo

Contemporary history

20th Century

This covers conflicts and terrorist attacks in the 1900s that occurred within the modern territory of the United States of America. This also includes attacks upon the United States from Eurasian powers.

1900–1950 
July 6–10, 1903 Evansville race riot
 April – July, 1905 Chicago teamsters' strike
 June 1, 1906 Cananea strike
 September 22–24 Atlanta Massacre of 1906
 1910–1919 Border War
 April 20, 1914 Ludlow Massacre
 1914–1918 World War I
 April 21, 1914 Ypiranga incident
July 22, 1916 Preparedness Day Bombing
 July 30, 1916 2:08:00 AM (AST; GMT−4) Black Tom explosion
 January 11, 1917 Kingsland Explosion
 August 2–3, 1917 Green Corn Rebellion
 July 21, 1918 Attack on Orleans
 August 7, 1918 Battle of Ambos Nogales
 1919 Red Summer
July 19–24 Washington D.C. race riot
July 27 – August 3 Chicago race riot
August 30–31 Knoxville riot
September 16, 1920 Wall Street bombing
 November 2–3, 1920 Ocoee massacre
 May 31 – June 1, 1921 Tulsa race riot
 1912 – 1921 West Virginia coal wars
 September 10–21, 1921 Battle of Blair Mountain
 December 14–15, 1922 Perry race riot
 January 1–7, 1923 Rosewood massacre
 March 20–23, 1923 Posey War
 November 21, 1927 Columbine Mine massacre
1931 July Red River Bridge War
1931 July 28 Bonus Army protest
1937 March 21 Ponce massacre
 1939 – 1945 World War II

 October 16, 1940 – May 21, 1941 Machita Incident
 December 7, 1941 Attack on Pearl Harbor 
 February 23, 1942 Bombardment of Ellwood
 February 24–25, 1942 Battle of Los Angeles
 June 3, 1942 – August 15, 1943 Battle of the Aleutian Islands
 June 21, 1942 Bombardment of Fort Stevens
 July 27, 1942 Lordsburg Killings
September 9–29, 1942 Lookout Air Raids
May 30, 1943 Zoot Suit Riots
August 14, 1944 Fort Lawton Riot
March 12, 1945 Santa Fe Riot
April 16, – September 17, 1945 Project Hula
May 5–6, 1945 Battle of Point Judith
July 8, 1945 Midnight Massacre

May 2–4, 1946 Battle of Alcatraz
August 1–3, 1946 Battle of Athens

1950–2000 
July 24–26, 1964 Rochester race riot
August 11–17, 1965 Watts Rebellion
July 12–15, 1966 Chicago West Side riots
July 18–23, 1966 Hough riots
Summer of 1967 Long, hot summer of 1967
June 26 – July 1 Buffalo riot
July 12–17 Newark riots
July 14–16 Plainfield riots
July 23–25 Toledo riot
July 23–27 Detroit riot
July 31 – August 3 Milwaukee riot
April 4 – May 27, 1968 King-assassination riots
April 4–5 New York City
April 4–8 Washington, D.C.
April 5–7 Chicago
April 5–11 Pittsburgh
April 6–14 Baltimore
April 9 Kansas City
April 9–10 Wilmington
August 7–8, 1968 Miami riots
August 23–28 1968 Democratic National Convention protests
June 28 – July 3, 1969 Stonewall riots
May 4, 1970 Kent State shootings
May 11–12, 1970 Augusta riot
August 24–27 1970 Memorial Park riot
September 9, 1971 Attica Prison riot
February 2–3, 1980 New Mexico State Penitentiary riot
May 17–20, 1980 Miami riots
May 13, 1985 Philadelphia MOVE bombing
April 29, 1992 Los Angeles riots
August 21–31, 1992 Ruby Ridge standoff
February 28 – April 19, 1993 Waco siege
April 19, 1995 Oklahoma City bombing
February 28, 1997 North Hollywood shootout
 March 19 – 20, 1997 Heaven's Gate mass suicide

21st century

This includes domestic conflicts and terrorist attacks that took place within the United States. Note that actions of terrorism and domestic conflict are distinguished from one another.

2001-2021 War on Terror
September 11, 2001 September 11 attacks
May 8, 2007 Fort Dix attack plot
November 5, 2009 Fort Hood shooting
 April 15, 2013 Boston Marathon bombing
 April 2, 2014 Fort Hood shootings
December 2, 2015 San Bernardino attack
June 12, 2016 Orlando nightclub shooting
October 31, 2017 New York City truck attack
December 6, 2019 Naval Air Station Pensacola shooting
 April 5, 2014-May 2014 Bundy standoff
August 9, 2014-December 2, 2014 Ferguson unrest
April 18, 2015-May 3, 2015 Baltimore protests
June 17, 2015 Charleston church shooting
January 1-February 16, 2016 Occupation of the Malheur National Wildlife Refuge
August 11–12, 2017 Unite the Right rally
October 27, 2018 Pittsburgh synagogue shooting
August 3, 2019 El Paso shooting
May 25, 2020-2023 2020–2023 United States racial unrest
August 26–31, 2020 Minneapolis false rumors riot
January 6, 2021, 2021 United States Capitol attack

See also
 Indian Wars
 Indian massacre
 Second Happy Time
 List of attacks on U.S. territory
 American Theater (World War II)
 List of conflicts in British America
 List of wars involving the United States
 United States military casualties of war
 List of incidents of civil unrest in the United States

Military history of the United States
United States military-related lists
United States history-related lists
Lists of events in the United States
United States
United States